Chu Ling Ling (born 15 February 1987) is a Hongkonger footballer who plays as a defender for Hong Kong Women League club Citizen AA and the Hong Kong women's national team.

International career
Chu Ling Ling has been capped for Hong Kong at senior level in both football and futsal. In football, she represented Hong Kong at three AFC Women's Asian Cup qualification editions (2008, 2010 and 2014), the 2016 AFC Women's Olympic Qualifying Tournament and the 2018 Asian Games.

In futsal, Chu Ling Ling played for Hong Kong at two AFC Women's Futsal Championship editions (2015 and 2018).

See also
List of Hong Kong women's international footballers

References

1987 births
Living people
Hong Kong women's futsal players
Hong Kong women's footballers
Women's association football defenders
Hong Kong women's international footballers
Footballers at the 2014 Asian Games
Footballers at the 2018 Asian Games
Asian Games competitors for Hong Kong